Parapsectris curvisaccula is a moth in the family Gelechiidae. It was described by Oleksiy V. Bidzilya in 2010. It is found in Namibia.

References

Endemic fauna of Namibia
Parapsectris
Moths described in 2010